Kuzminka is a rural locality (a village) in Almozerskoye Rural Settlement, Vytegorsky District, Vologda Oblast, Russia. The population was 22 as of 2002.

Geography 
Kuzminka is located 68 km southeast of Vytegra (the district's administrative centre) by road. Karpovskaya is the nearest rural locality.

References 

Rural localities in Vytegorsky District